List of speakers of the National Assembly of Lesotho.

The National Assembly was established in 1965 and was preceded by Basutoland National Council. Walter P. Stanford was the speaker of the National Council from 1961 to 1965. Below is a list of office-holders:

References

Politics of Lesotho
1965 establishments in Basutoland
Lesotho
Lesotho politics-related lists